Chah Haftad Tumani may refer to:
 Chah Haftad Tumani-ye Yek
 Chah Haftad Tumani-ye Do